Keraniganj Railway Station is an railway station under construction on Dhaka–Jessore line located in Keraniganj Upazila, Dhaka District, Bangladesh. This modern railway station is situated near Stan Bazar, is not so far from Baluchar of Munshiganj District, which is under construction.

History
Ministry of Railways is constructing 172 km broad-gauge railway. The railway line starts from Dhaka, capital of Bangladesh to Jessore. Under the Railway Link Project of Padma Bridge, 14 railway stations will be built and 6 railway station will be repaired. 310 rail bridges will be built for the new railway line. 66 of 310 are major and 244 are minor bridges.

References

External links
 

Keraniganj Upazila
Railway stations in Dhaka District
Railway stations scheduled to open in 2023